Syarhey Viktaravich Kislyak (born 6 August 1987) is a Belarusian professional footballer who plays for Dinamo Brest.

Career

Club
In summer 2010 Kislyak was signed by Rubin Kazan, but stayed on loan in his previous team Dinamo Minsk until the end of 2010 season. He finally joined Rubin in December 2010.

On 2 February 2018, Kislyak signed for Kazakhstan Premier League club Irtysh Pavlodar. He returned to Belarus, joining Dinamo Brest in September 2018, signing a contract for two and a half years.

International
Kislyak netted the only two goals for Belarus U-21 at the 2009 UEFA European Under-21 Football Championship, opening the scoring in the matches against Sweden U-21 and Italy U-21.

On 14 November 2009, Kislyak made his international debut for the senior side, coming on as a last-minute substitute for Sergei Kornilenko in the 1–1 away draw with Saudi Arabia in a friendly match.

On 30 May 2010, he scored his first goal for the senior side in the 1–0 friendly win against South Korea.

On 3 September 2010, Kislyak scored the only goal for the Belarusians in the 1–0 away win against France after a Vyacheslav Hleb assist to help provide a winning start to the country's Euro 2012 qualification campaign.

Career statistics

International

Statistics accurate as of match played 28 March 2017

International goals
Scores and results list Belarus' goal tally first.

Honours
Dinamo Minsk
Belarusian Premier League champion: 2004

Rubin Kazan
Russian Cup winner: 2011–12

Dinamo Brest
Belarusian Premier League champion: 2019
Belarusian Super Cup winner: 2019, 2020

Personal
Kislyak has stated that his childhood football idols were Shevchenko and Maradona, while he also admires the playing style of Steven Gerrard.

References

External links
 
 
 

1987 births
Living people
People from Kamyenyets
Sportspeople from Brest Region
Belarusian footballers
Association football midfielders
Belarus international footballers
Belarusian expatriate footballers
Expatriate footballers in Russia
Expatriate footballers in Turkey
Expatriate footballers in Kazakhstan
Belarusian Premier League players
Russian Premier League players
FC RUOR Minsk players
FC Dinamo Minsk players
FC Rubin Kazan players
FC Krasnodar players
Gaziantepspor footballers
FC Irtysh Pavlodar players
FC Dynamo Brest players